Prince Piotr Michał Czartoryski (1 September 1909 – 17 December 1993) was a Polish noble (szlachcic).

Piotr became Master Engineer, Doctor Honoris Causa of the Jagiellonian University and was Capitan (reserve) of the Armia Krajowa, during the Second World War.

He married  Anna Zamoyska and had three children, Monika Maria Czartoryska, Krzysztof Piotr Czartoryski and Joanna Maria Czartoryska.

References

1909 births
1993 deaths
Polish resistance members of World War II
Piotr Michal Czartoryski